Justice League Dark: Apokolips War is a 2020 American adult animated superhero film produced by Warner Bros. Animation and distributed by Warner Home Video. The film is directed by Matt Peters and Christina Sotta, while Ernie Altbacker and Mairghread Scott wrote the screenplay. It stars an ensemble cast including Matt Ryan, Jerry O'Connell, Taissa Farmiga, Stuart Allan, Tony Todd, Ray Chase, Jason O'Mara, Rosario Dawson, Shemar Moore, Camilla Luddington, Christopher Gorham, Rebecca Romijn, Hynden Walch, Liam McIntyre, John DiMaggio, Sachie Alessio, Roger R. Cross, and Rainn Wilson. In the film, members of the Justice League, Justice League Dark, Teen Titans and Suicide Squad join forces against Darkseid to save Earth.

Based on the comic book storylines "Darkseid War" by Geoff Johns, "Final Crisis" by Grant Morrison, and elements of "Futures End", it is the 38th DC Universe Animated Original Movie as well as the sixteenth and final feature film set in the DC Animated Movie Universe (DCAMU), generally marking the continuity's conclusion. The film was released digitally on May 5, 2020, and in 4K/Blu-ray/DVD on May 19. It received mostly positive reviews from critics and fans alike.

Plot
Following two failed attempts at conquering Earth, the Justice League devise a plan to defeat Darkseid by infiltrating Apokolips while leaving the Teen Titans on Earth to defend it. Unbeknownst to them, Darkseid spies on the League through Cyborg. The League is overwhelmed and defeated by Paradooms — genetic hybrid creatures made from Parademons and Doomsday—and a majority of the heroes from both the League and the Titans are killed, while those who survive are placed into Darkseid's slavery.

Two years later, Darkseid has placed devices known as "Reapers" which mine the planet's core. Superman who had been forcibly depowered after Darkseid tattooed his chest with liquid kryptonite, escaped from Apokolips and reunites with Raven, who has been struggling to maintain her father Trigon's imprisonment. They seek John Constantine for a location spell to track Damian Wayne. Although reluctant to help at first, considering himself a coward for fleeing during the initial attack on Darkseid and leaving his lover Zatanna to die, Constantine locates Damian at a League of Assassins outpost. Clark explains to Damian they need him to help free his father Batman from Darkseid's mind control. Damian reluctantly agrees to join the group.

The group travel to Stryker's Island in Metropolis and meet with Clark's wife Lois Lane who has recruited the Suicide Squad to their cause, now led by Harley Quinn. Clark and Lois reveal their plan to infiltrate LexCorp and use a boom tube to return to Apokolips and kill Darkseid. Meanwhile, the remaining heroes launch an attack on the Reapers but are overrun and killed battling the Paradooms. At the building, they are confronted by Lex Luthor, who reveals he was working with Lois to gain intel on Darkseid. The group splits into two with Clark, Raven, Constantine, and Etrigan the Demon going to Apokolips and Lois, Luthor, and the Squad remaining at the building to defend the boom tube. Batman informs Darkseid of Luthor's betrayal, prompting Batman to send Paradooms and the newly converted mechanical Furies after the heroes.

Upon arrival, Clark's group is attacked by the Furies, consisting of cybernetic versions of Wonder Woman, Mera, Hawkman, Starfire, and Martian Manhunter. Etrigan is killed by Wonder Woman, but Constantine manages to break her free using her Lasso of Truth. She decides to stay behind to fend off the other Furies as the group head on. They also rescue Flash from a treadmill powering Apokolips; Constantine learns that Flash had altered the timeline in the past. Shortly thereafter, they are confronted by Cyborg, who has been integrated into the planet's network. Constantine frees Cyborg from Darkseid's control, which also frees the remaining Furies as they are about to overpower Wonder Woman. Darkseid orders Batman to kill Damian but he hesitates when he is reminded of his parents' death, which breaks him free of Darkseid's mind control. In a fit of rage, Darkseid tries to kill Batman but is intercepted by Damian, who dies in Batman's arms. His death overwhelms Raven, her sudden emotional instability setting Trigon free. Constantine offers his body as a vessel for Trigon, but he refuses and takes Clark's body instead, purging the kryptonite from his body, restoring his powers, and killing Constantine. Now possessing Clark, Trigon attacks Darkseid. Constantine is briefly visited by Zatanna in the afterlife, who reveals she used a spell to manipulate Constantine to flee back to Earth as part of a contingency plan prepared by Batman. Simultaneously, Raven and Zatanna revive Damian and Constantine.

Back at LexCorp, Lois's team is surrounded by Paradooms, prompting them to initiate a self-destruct. Lois transmits a goodbye message to Apokolips with Cyborg's assistance. Her death shocks Clark back to his senses and frees him from Trigon's possession. Constantine and Raven combine their magic to give Trigon a physical body so he can continue fighting Darkseid. Cyborg plans to teleport the Paradooms back to Apokolips while dragging the planet into a boom tube with no exit. Cyborg teleports the heroes back to Earth and commences his plan. Relishing the battle, Trigon prevents Darkseid's escape as they are dragged into oblivion.

Despite their victory, Batman reveals one-third of Earth's magma has been drained by the Reapers, the planet's rotation was compromised, and that people will continue to die by the billions before the League can potentially find a solution. As a result, Constantine convinces Flash to run back in time and reset the timeline again despite knowing that the world will not be the same as before. Flash eventually agrees, and the remaining heroes watch as Barry makes another flashpoint, resetting the timeline.

Voice cast

Production
The film was first announced in July 2019 at San Diego Comic-Con. Several voice actors from previous DC Animated Movie Universe films reprised their respective roles.

Release
The film was released on digital platforms on May 5, 2020, and  release on 4K/Blu-ray/DVD on May 19, respectively. It features a showcase animated short based on Adam Strange.

Reception

Critical response
Jesse Schden of IGN movies said: "This film takes full advantage of the fact that it's the final chapter in a 15-movie arc. Its narrative veers into some very surprising and compelling directions, and somehow it manages to pay off on loose ends from across the DCU".

Revenue
The film earned $5,474,509 from domestic Blu-ray sales.

Future
In spite of Justice League Dark: Apokolips War being confirmed as the last film in the DCAMU, screenwriter Ernie Altbacker teased the possibility of a new project related to that continuity. He stated that "the way we ended it... it's really like a tough balancing act: It ends something on a bittersweet yet hopeful note, and I'll just say, people who are saying, 'Oh man, we're not going to get anymore of these!' ...you're not losing something, you're gaining something new..."

In May 2022, Constantine: The House of Mystery was released. The short film deals with the aftermath of JLD: Apokolips War.

Notes

References

External links
DC page
 

Bisexuality-related films
2020 animated films
2020s English-language films
2020s American animated films
Apocalyptic films
2020s direct-to-video animated superhero films
2020 direct-to-video films
2020 films
American adult animated films
American splatter films
American superhero films
Animated Justice League films
Animated films about extraterrestrial life
DC Animated Movie Universe
Alien invasions in films
Demons in film
LGBT-related animated superhero films
2020 LGBT-related films
Films scored by Frederik Wiedmann
Films set in 2020
Films set in 2022
Films set on fictional planets
Resurrection in film
Films directed by Matt Peters